Rubus schmidelioides, commonly called bush lawyer, is a climbing plant species from New Zealand. Its hooked branches allow it to climb across the ground and into shrubs and trees. R.schmidelioides fruit are yellow to orange.

References

External links
 
 

schmidelioides
Flora of New Zealand